The 2016 World University American Football Championship was an international college American football tournament that was held from June 1 to June 11, 2016 in Monterrey, Mexico, at Estadio Tecnológico. It was the 2nd World University Championship for team American football. The tournament was held in round-robin format, with each team facing each other once.

Mexico repeated as champions as they defeated the United States 35–7 in the final, with Mexico quarterback Francisco Mata Charles earning championship game MVP honors.

Teams

 (did not attend)
Note:
India did not attend due to visa issues.

Final standings

Matches
Game 1

Game 2

Game 3

Game 4

Game 5

Game 6

Game 7

Game 8

Game 9

Game 10

References

External links
Competition Results

World University American Football Championship
2016 in Mexican sports
IFAF
International sports competitions hosted by Mexico
American